Isaiah Washington IV is an American actor and media personality. Following a series of film appearances, he came to prominence for portraying Dr. Preston Burke in the first three seasons of the series Grey's Anatomy from 2005 to 2007.

Washington began his career collaborating with director Spike Lee on the films Crooklyn (1994), Clockers (1995), Girl 6 (1996), and Get on the Bus (1996). He also appeared in the films Love Jones (1997), Bulworth (1998), True Crime (1999), Romeo Must Die (2000), Exit Wounds (2001), Ghost Ship (2002), and Hollywood Homicide (2003). In 2005, Washington landed his breakthrough role as Preston Burke on Grey's Anatomy. He was dismissed after the third season due to his usage of a homophobic slur while referring to a cast member, T. R. Knight, although he would return for a guest appearance in 2014.  From 2014 to 2018, Washington portrayed Thelonious Jaha on The CW's science fiction television series The 100.

In 2020, Washington became the host of a travel cooking show on Fox Nation.

Early life
Washington was born in Houston, Texas, where his parents were residents in the Houston Heights community.  His parents moved to Missouri City, Texas around 1980, where he was one of the first graduates from Willowridge High School, Houston, in 1981. Washington revealed in an interview with Star Jones that his father, after whom he was named, was murdered when he was 13 years old. He joined the United States Air Force when he was 19 years old, where he worked on the Northrop T-38 Talon. His first assignment was at Clark Air Base in the Philippines followed by two years at Holloman Air Force Base in Alamogordo, New Mexico. After serving in the Air Force, he attended Howard University.

Career

Early roles
Washington made his feature film debut in 1991's Strictly Business before engaging in a string of collaborations with director Spike Lee. Between 1994 and 1996, Washington appeared in Lee's films Crooklyn, Clockers, Girl 6, and Get on the Bus. He also had roles in the films Stonewall, Dead Presidents, Love Jones, Out of Sight, Bulworth, True Crime, Romeo Must Die, Exit Wounds, Hollywood Homicide, and Wild Things 2.

Grey's Anatomy
In 2005, Washington originated the role of gifted cardiothoracic surgeon Dr. Preston Burke on the ABC medical drama Grey's Anatomy.  His portrayal earned him two NAACP Image Awards for Outstanding Actor in a Drama Series, as well as a Screen Actors Guild Award. He was paired onscreen with Sandra Oh, who plays intern Cristina Yang. Washington had originally auditioned for the role of Derek Shepherd, which ultimately went to Patrick Dempsey. Burke had originally been described as a nebbishy, stout forty-something man. For his portrayal of Burke, Isaiah was honored by TV Guide as one of "TV's Sexiest Men" in June 2006, and was named one of TV's sexiest doctors in June 2008 on TV Guides television channel. Prior to the TV Guide honor, Isaiah was named as one of Peoples "50 Beautiful People" in May 2006. On March 6, 2014, ABC announced that Washington would be returning to the show in a guest appearance as Burke. He returned in season 10, which served as part of a farewell storyline for Sandra Oh's character, Cristina Yang. The characters had been previously engaged to be married.

Dismissal controversy
In the show's third season, Washington became a central figure in a widely reported backstage controversy. In October 2006, rumors surfaced that Washington allegedly insulted co-star T. R. Knight with a homophobic slur while arguing with Patrick Dempsey. Knight was not on the set at the time. Shortly after the details of the argument became public, Knight publicly disclosed that he was gay. There were rumors that Knight was going to be outed by the media. The situation seemed somewhat resolved when Washington issued a statement, apologizing for his "unfortunate use of words during the recent incident on-set".

While being interviewed on the red carpet at the Golden Globes in January 2007, Washington joked, "I love gay. I wanted to be gay. Please let me be gay". After the show won Best Drama, Washington, in response to press queries as to any conflicts backstage, said, "No, I did not call T.R. a faggot". However, in an interview with Ellen DeGeneres on The Ellen DeGeneres Show, Knight said that "everybody heard him".

After being rebuked by his studio, Touchstone Television (now ABC Studios), Washington issued a statement apologizing at length for using the epithet in an argument with Patrick Dempsey. On January 30, 2007, a source told People magazine that Washington was scheduled to return to the Grey's Anatomy set as early as that Thursday for the first time since entering "executive counseling" after making the comments at the Golden Globes.

However, on June 7, 2007, ABC announced it had decided not to renew Washington's contract, and that he would be dropped from the show. "I'm mad as hell and I'm not going to take it anymore," Washington said in a statement released by his publicist (borrowing the famous line from Network).  In another report, Washington stated he was planning to "spend the summer pursuing charity work in Sierra Leone, work on an independent film and avoid worrying about the show". Washington, in late June 2007, began asserting that racism within the media was a factor in his firing from the series. On July 2, 2007, Washington appeared on Larry King Live on CNN, to present his side of the controversy. According to Washington, he never used the "F Word" in reference to Knight, but rather told Dempsey to stop treating him like a "F-word" during an argument "provoked" by Dempsey, who, he felt, was treating him like a "B-word", a "P-word", and the "F-word", which Washington said conveyed "somebody who is being weak and afraid to fight back". He also disputed the accusations made by Knight, who he claimed was misrepresenting himself out of disappointment over his character.

In July 2007, NBC decided to cast Washington as a guest star in a story arc in its new series Bionic Woman. NBC co-chairman Ben Silverman noted his eagerness to work with Washington, saying it would be "like A-Rod leaving the Yankees in midseason".  However, Bionic Woman was cancelled after only eight episodes due to low ratings. Washington himself said that his dismissal from Grey's Anatomy was an unfortunate misunderstanding that he was eager to move past. By the beginning of the next season of Grey's Anatomy, Washington's character "Burke" had left the show following the end of the season finale.

In January 2014, in an interview with I Am Entertainment magazine, Washington spoke about life after Grey's Anatomy and he stated, "I don't worry about whether or not the stories I tell will destroy my acting career, because you can't take away something that doesn't exist. They killed the actor [in me] on June 7, 2007."

Recent work 
Washington played the role of Chancellor Jaha in The 100, an American post-apocalyptic drama television series that began airing on The CW Television Network in spring 2014.  The series is based on a book of the same name by Kass Morgan, and developed by Jason Rothenberg. Washington's character was killed in the second episode of the show's fifth season, "Red Queen".

Washington also starred in the film Blue Caprice, which was inspired by the 2002 D.C. sniper attacks. Washington portrayed perpetrator John Allen Muhammad, with Tequan Richmond playing Muhammed's accomplice Lee Boyd Malvo. The film was released in theaters on September 13, 2013.

Washington began hosting a travel and cooking show Isaiah Washington: Kitchen Talk on Fox Nation, the streaming service arm of the Fox conglomerate, in 2020.

In 2022, Washington made his directorial debut with the film Corsicana, which he also co-wrote and starred in.

Personal life
Washington endorsed Jill Stein for President of the United States in 2016, but has since become a member of the #WalkAway movement.

In 2019, Washington expressed political alignment with the Republican Party.

Genealogical inquiry
Washington is of African descent.  He has written a book called A Man from Another Land, which chronicles Washington's early life, his TV and film career, and his search to find his roots after going through a DNA test that showed his ancestors came from Sierra Leone in West Africa.  A genealogical DNA test conducted by African Ancestry, Inc. revealed that Washington's maternal ancestry can be traced to what is now Sierra Leone, and that he has an ancestral link to the Mende and Temne peoples there. Since learning about his history, Washington has traveled to Sierra Leone, donated medical supplies to a hospital there, and built a school.  He traveled to Sierra Leone in May 2006 marking the beginning of his charity work and was granted Sierra Leonean citizenship, making him the first African American to be granted full citizenship based on DNA.  He has also been vested with a chieftaincy title of the Mende people in appreciation for his work in the country, taking the regnal name of Gondobay Manga II. His paternal ancestry also links him to the Mbundu people, an ethnic group in Angola.

Filmography

Film

Television

Awards and nominations

References

External links

Isaiah Washington goes Bionic

Living people
1960s births
20th-century African-American people
20th-century American male actors
20th-century Sierra Leonean male actors
21st-century African-American people
21st-century American male actors
21st-century Sierra Leonean male actors
African-American male actors
American male film actors
American male television actors
American people of Angolan descent
American people of Mende descent
American people of Sierra Leonean descent
Howard University alumni
Male actors from Houston
United States Air Force airmen